The 2021 PGA Championship was the 103rd PGA Championship, held May 20–23 in South Carolina at Kiawah Island Golf Resort's Ocean Course on Kiawah Island. It was the second major championship at the Ocean Course; the PGA Championship in August 2012 was won by Rory McIlroy.

Without spectators at the previous edition in August 2020 due to the COVID-19 pandemic, the PGA of America announced in February 2021 that 10,000 fans would be admitted daily.

Phil Mickelson won his second PGA Championship and sixth major, two strokes ahead of runners-up Brooks Koepka and Louis Oosthuizen. Aged fifty years and eleven months, he became the oldest to win a major, a distinction previously held by Julius Boros, the winner of the PGA Championship in 1968 at age 48.

Venue

Course layout

Source:

Lengths of the course for previous majors:
 , par 72 - 2012 PGA Championship

Field
The field for the PGA Championship is sometimes regarded as the strongest in professional golf, routinely having the highest "strength of field rating" of the year according to the Official World Golf Ranking. A number of qualification criteria are used to determine the field, which includes past PGA champions, recent major winners, top finishers in the 2020 PGA Championship, Ryder Cup players, tournament and leading money winners on the PGA Tour, and twenty PGA club or teaching professionals. The PGA of America also issue invitations to players outside of these criteria, which is generally seen to include the top one hundred in the world rankings.

Criteria
This list details the qualification criteria for the 2021 PGA Championship and the players who qualified under them; any additional criteria under which players qualified is indicated in parentheses.

1. All past winners of the PGA Championship.

Rich Beem
Keegan Bradley (8)
John Daly
Jason Day (6,8)
Jason Dufner
Pádraig Harrington
Martin Kaymer
Brooks Koepka (3,8,9,10)
Rory McIlroy (5,8,9,10)
Shaun Micheel
Phil Mickelson
Collin Morikawa (6,8,10)
Justin Thomas (5,8,9,10)
Jimmy Walker
Yang Yong-eun

Tiger Woods (2) did not play.
Vijay Singh withdrew due to a back injury.

2. Recent winners of the Masters Tournament (2017–2021)

Sergio García (8,9,10)
Dustin Johnson (3,6,8,9,10)
Hideki Matsuyama (8)
Patrick Reed (6,8,9,10)

3. Recent winners of the U.S. Open (2016–2020)

Bryson DeChambeau (8,9,10)
Gary Woodland

4. Recent winners of The Open Championship (2015–2019)

Zach Johnson
Shane Lowry (8)
Jordan Spieth (8,9,10)
Henrik Stenson

Francesco Molinari withdrew due to a back injury.

5. Recent winners of The Players Championship (2019–2021)

6. The leading 15 players, and those tying for 15th place, in the 2020 PGA Championship

Daniel Berger (8,10)
Paul Casey (8,9)
Cameron Champ
Joel Dahmen (8,10)
Tony Finau (8,9)
Kim Si-woo (8,10)
Jon Rahm (8,9,10)
Justin Rose (9)
Xander Schauffele (8)
Scottie Scheffler (8)

Matthew Wolff (8) did not play.

7. The leading 20 players in the 2021 PGA Professional Championship

Danny Balin
Peter Ballo
Alex Beach
Frank Bensel Jr.
Tyler Collet
Ben Cook
Mark Geddes
Larkin Gross
Derek Holmes
Greg Koch
Rob Labritz
Brad Marek
Tim Pearce
Ben Polland
Patrick Rada
Sonny Skinner
Stuart Smith
Joe Summerhays
Omar Uresti
Brett Walker

8. The 70 leading PGA Championship Points earners from the 2020 WGC-FedEx St. Jude Invitational (and Barracuda Championship) through the 2021 Wells Fargo Championship (May 9, 2021)

Abraham Ancer
Sam Burns (10)
Patrick Cantlay (10)
Stewart Cink (10)
Corey Conners
Harris English (10)
Matt Fitzpatrick
Talor Gooch
Lanto Griffin
Emiliano Grillo
Brian Harman
Tyrrell Hatton (9)
Russell Henley
Jim Herman (10)
Charley Hoffman
Max Homa (10)
Billy Horschel (10)
Viktor Hovland (10)
Mackenzie Hughes
Im Sung-jae
Matt Jones (10)
Chris Kirk
Kevin Kisner
Jason Kokrak (10)
Matt Kuchar
Martin Laird (10)
Marc Leishman (10)
Adam Long
Peter Malnati
Maverick McNealy
Sebastián Muñoz
Kevin Na (10)
Joaquín Niemann
Louis Oosthuizen
Carlos Ortiz (10)
Ryan Palmer
Webb Simpson (9)
Cameron Smith (10)
Brendan Steele
Robert Streb (10)
Brendon Todd
Cameron Tringale
Harold Varner III
Bubba Watson (9)
Richy Werenski
Lee Westwood
Aaron Wise
Will Zalatoris

9. Playing members of the 2018 Ryder Cup teams, who are ranked within the top 100 on the Official World Golf Ranking as of May 9, 2021

Tommy Fleetwood
Ian Poulter

10. Winners of official tournaments on the PGA Tour from the 2020 Wyndham Championship until the start of the championship

Brian Gay
Branden Grace
Lee Kyoung-hoon
Hudson Swafford

11. PGA of America invitees

An Byeong-hun
Christiaan Bezuidenhout
Dean Burmester
John Catlin
George Coetzee
Thomas Detry
Rickie Fowler
Dylan Frittelli
Adam Hadwin
Lucas Herbert
Garrick Higgo
Rasmus Højgaard
Sam Horsfield
Rikuya Hoshino
Jazz Janewattananond
Takumi Kanaya
Chan Kim
Kurt Kitayama
Tom Lewis
Robert MacIntyre
Victor Perez
Thomas Pieters
J. T. Poston
Aaron Rai
Chez Reavie
Antoine Rozner
Kalle Samooja
Charl Schwartzel
Adam Scott
Jason Scrivener
Kevin Streelman
Steve Stricker
Brandon Stone
Andy Sullivan
Sami Välimäki
Erik van Rooyen
Daniel van Tonder
Matt Wallace
Bernd Wiesberger
Danny Willett

12. If necessary, the field is completed by players in order of PGA Championship points earned (per 8.)

Cameron Davis
Harry Higgs
Denny McCarthy
Alex Norén

Alternates (per category 12):
Tom Hoge (78th in standings) – replaced Wolff
Wyndham Clark (82nd) – replaced Singh
Brandon Hagy (83rd) – replaced Molinari

Round summaries

First round
Thursday, May 20, 2021

Corey Conners made six birdies and only one bogey in a round of 67 (−5) to take a two-shot lead after the first round. Two-time champion Brooks Koepka, despite making a double-bogey on his opening hole of the tournament, was part of a six-way tie for second at three-under that also included 2011 champion Keegan Bradley.

Defending champion Collin Morikawa opened with a two-under round of 70 and was tied for eighth with seven other players, including 2005 champion Phil Mickelson. Mickelson made four bogeys over his first six holes before rebounding with four birdies on the back nine. Rory McIlroy, who won by eight shots the last time the tournament was held at Kiawah Island in 2012, shot a three-over 75 and was tied for 77th after the first 18 holes.

Second round
Friday, May 21, 2021

Phil Mickelson made five birdies over his last nine holes, including a 23-foot putt on the ninth (his 18th), to share the 36-hole lead with Louis Oosthuizen at five-under. At the age of 50, Mickelson became the oldest player to lead the PGA Championship after the second round since Sam Snead in 1966. He also became the sixth player to hold the lead in a major championship in four different decades.

Oosthuizen was five-under on his round before making his only bogey at the 18th to fall into a tie with Mickelson. Two-time champion Brooks Koepka made two eagles and got into a share of the lead at six-under before bogeys at the 15th and 17th; he shot 71 (−1) to finish a shot off the lead.

Masters champion Hideki Matsuyama was also five-under for the round and one back before making bogey on 18. His four-under 68 tied Oosthuizen for lowest round of the day. First-round leader Corey Conners bogeyed five of his first six holes and shot 75 (+3) to fall into a tie for seventh place, three shots back.

The 36-hole cut came at 149 (+5). Notables to miss the cut included Dustin Johnson and Justin Thomas, the two top players on the World Golf Rankings, as well as Cameron Tringale, who began the round inside the top 10 but shot 10-over 82 after suffering through a 12-over-par 48 on the back nine Friday (his front nine).  Tringale rebounded with a 2-under 34 on the front, but the cut was 5-over and he missed by three.

Third round
Saturday, May 22, 2021

Phil Mickelson, tied for the lead at the start of the round, went four-under on the front nine and added another birdie on the 10th to open up a five-shot lead at 10-under. At the 12th, he hit his tee shot into a sandy area and had to chip out into the fairway, making his first bogey in 20 holes. His drive on the 13th went into the water hazard to the right of the fairway, leading to a double-bogey that dropped his lead to just one shot. He made par on his last five holes to finish with a two-under round of 70 and seven-under for the tournament.

Brooks Koepka, meanwhile, holed birdie putts from 11 feet on the 10th and 20 feet on the 12th and was three-under on the back nine to tie Mickelson at seven-under. At the 18th, however, he failed to get up-and-down from behind the green and made bogey to fall to six-under, one behind Mickelson.

Louis Oosthuizen, playing in the final group with Mickelson, also drove into the water on 13 and made bogey, then three-putted from 25 feet on the 17th for another bogey. He shot even-par 72 and finished two back of the lead at five-under.

At 50, Mickelson became the oldest 54-hole leader in PGA Championship history, and the oldest in any major since Tom Watson at the 2009 Open Championship.

Final round
Sunday, May 23, 2021

Summary

Phil Mickelson, at the age of 50, became the oldest golfer to win a major championship, shooting a one-over 73 to finish two shots ahead of Brooks Koepka and Louis Oosthuizen.

Mickelson began the round with a one-shot lead over Koepka, but fell from atop the leaderboard after making bogey on the first while Koepka made birdie to grab the lead.
Mickelson regained the lead with a birdie on the par-five second hole as Koepka suffered a double-bogey. At the par-three fifth, Mickelson found a sandy area off the tee but holed his shot for a birdie. Even-par making the turn, he led Koepka and Oosthuizen by two.

Mickelson extended his lead on the 10th, holing a 12-foot putt for birdie. When Koepka made bogey on both 10 and 11, Mickelson opened up a four-shot lead. Oosthuizen, meanwhile, fell from contention after hitting his third shot on the 13th into the water and making double-bogey. He came back with a birdie at the par-five 16th and shot 73, finishing at four-under for the tournament.

Koepka was four-over between holes 7-13 before making birdies on the 15th and 16th, joining Oosthuizen at four-under after a two-over 74. Mickelson saw his lead cut in half after also finding the water with his approach on 13, settling for a bogey before dropping another shot on the 14th. At the 16th, he hit a 366-yard drive, the longest of any player on that hole all tournament, and got up-and-down from over the green for a birdie to get to seven-under. Despite making a bogey on the par-three 17th after having to chop out of thick rough, he tapped in for par on the 18th to win his second PGA Championship and sixth major championship.

Final leaderboard

Scorecard
Final round

Cumulative tournament scores, relative to par

Media
ESPN and CBS have the media rights to the 2021 PGA Championship. This marks the second year of the media rights deal signed in October 2018, replacing the old deal with TNT and CBS. In the UK and Ireland, Sky Sports broadcast the event.  This is the 31st consecutive PGA Championship on CBS Sports.

Notes

References

External links

Coverage on the PGA Tour's official site
Coverage on the European Tour's official site

PGA Championship
Golf in South Carolina
PGA Championship
PGA Championship
PGA Championship
PGA Championship